Levan Maghradze (born 5 December 1977) is a retired football midfielder from Georgia. In the past he played for Apollon Limassol, FC Zestafoni, TSU Tbilisi, Aris Limassol, AEP Paphos, AEL FC, Skoda Xanthi, Apollon Limassol and Ethnikos Achna.

In 2009, he was signed by newly promoted Ermis Aradippou.

External links
 
 

1977 births
Living people
Association football midfielders
Footballers from Georgia (country)
Aris Limassol FC players
AEL Limassol players
AEP Paphos FC players
Apollon Limassol FC players
Xanthi F.C. players
Ermis Aradippou FC players
Ethnikos Achna FC players
Cypriot First Division players
Cypriot Second Division players
Georgia (country) international footballers
Expatriate footballers in Cyprus
Karmiotissa FC players
Enosis Neon Parekklisia FC players